Charles W. Ray (August 6, 1872 - March 23, 1959) was a sergeant in the United States Army and a Medal of Honor recipient for his actions in the Philippine–American War.

Medal of Honor citation
Rank and organization: Sergeant, Company I, 22d U.S. Infantry. Place and date: Near San Isidro, Luzon, Philippine Islands, 19 October 1899. Entered service at: St. Louis, Mo. Birth: Pensacola Yancey County, N.C. Date of issue: 18 April 1902.

Citation:

Most distinguished gallantry in action. Captured a bridge with the detachment he commanded and held it against a superior force of the enemy, thereby enabling an army to come up and cross.

See also
List of Medal of Honor recipients
List of Philippine–American War Medal of Honor recipients

References

External links

Iowa Medal of Honor Heroes

1872 births
1959 deaths
People from Yancey County, North Carolina
American military personnel of the Philippine–American War
United States Army Medal of Honor recipients
United States Army soldiers
Philippine–American War recipients of the Medal of Honor